Uri Dahan (or Ori, ; born ) is an Israeli footballer who plays as a centre-back for Beitar Jerusalem.

Early life
Dahan was born in Hatzor HaGlilit, Israel, to a Sephardic Jewish family.

Career
Dahan was born in Hatzor HaGlilit and raised in Rosh Pinna.

Dahan made his professional debut for Ironi Kiryat Shmona in the Israeli Premier League on 30 November 2019, in the home match against Maccabi Tel Aviv, which finished as a 0–1 loss.

Honours 
Maccabi Haifa
 Israeli Premier League: 2021–22
 Toto Cup: 2021–22
 Israel Super Cup: 2021

References

External links
 
 

1998 births
Living people
Israeli Sephardi Jews
Israeli Mizrahi Jews
Israeli footballers
Hapoel Ironi Kiryat Shmona F.C. players
Maccabi Haifa F.C. players
Beitar Jerusalem F.C. players
Israeli Premier League players
Israel youth international footballers
Israel under-21 international footballers
Association football defenders
Israeli people of Moroccan-Jewish descent
People from Hatzor HaGlilit
People from Rosh Pinna